El Carmen District is one of eleven districts of the province Chincha in Peru.

Gallery

See also
Hacienda San José (hotel)

References

1916 establishments in Peru